Afra Takht (also Romanized as Afrā Takht; also known as Afrā Takhī) is a village in Bisheh Sar Rural District, in the Central District of Qaem Shahr County, Mazandaran Province, Iran. At the 2006 census, its population was 789, in 190 families.

References 

Populated places in Qaem Shahr County